McMinn is a surname. Notable people with the surname include:
Gilbert Rotherdale McMinn (1841–1924), Australian surveyor, brother of William (see below) and Joseph, both surveyors
Joseph McMinn (1758–1824), governor of Tennessee from 1815 to 1821
Ted McMinn (born 1962), Scottish former footballer
Teri McMinn (born 1951), American actress
William McMinn (1844–1884), Australian surveyor and architect, brother of Gilbert and Joseph, both surveyors

See also
McMinn County High School
McMinn Central High School
McMinn County Airport
McMinnville (disambiguation), several articles including
McMinnville, Oregon
McMinnville, Tennessee